Björn Simon (born 18 May 1981) is a German politician of the Christian Democratic Union (CDU) who has been serving as a member of the Bundestag from the state of Hesse since 2017.

Political career 
Simon became a member of the Bundestag in the 2017 German federal election, representing the Offenbach district. He is a member of the Committee on the Environment, Nature Conservation and Nuclear Safety and the Committee on Transport and Digital Infrastructure. In this capacity, he serves as his parliamentary group’s rapporteur on resource efficiency and the circular economy.

References

External links 

  
 Bundestag biography 

1981 births
Living people
Members of the Bundestag for Hesse
Members of the Bundestag 2021–2025
Members of the Bundestag 2017–2021
Members of the Bundestag for the Christian Democratic Union of Germany